FRAS1-related extracellular matrix protein 2 is a protein that in humans is encoded by the FREM2 gene.

This gene encodes a membrane protein that belongs to the FRAS1 family. This extracellular matrix protein is thought to be required for maintaining the integrity of the skin epithelium and the differentiated state of renal epithelia. The protein localizes to the basement membrane, forming a ternary complex that plays a role in epidermal-dermal interactions during morphogenetic processes. Mutations in this gene are associated with Fraser syndrome.

References

Further reading